Allium maximowiczii, English common name oriental chive, is an Asian plant species native to Siberia, the Russian Far East, Mongolia, Japan, Korea and northeastern China (Heilongjiang, Jilin  and Inner Mongolia).

Allium maximowiczii produces one or two bulbs. Scape is up to 70 cm tall. Leaves are tubular, shorter than the scape. Umbels are densely packed with large numbers of pink or red flowers.

References

maximowiczii
Onions
Flora of temperate Asia
Plants described in 1875